The Future Ahead is a 2017 Argentine drama film directed by Constanza Novick. It was screened in the Discovery section at the 2017 Toronto International Film Festival.

Cast
 Dolores Fonzi as Romina
 Pilar Gamboa as Florencia

References

External links
 

2017 films
2017 drama films
Argentine drama films
2010s Spanish-language films
2010s Argentine films